The CIFL Championship Game was the annual championship game of the Continental Indoor Football League (CIFL). In 2006, it was the meeting of the two semifinal game winners.  Following the 2007 and 2008 season, the game was between the Great Lakes Division champion and the Atlantic Division champion. In 2009 the league was divided into an East and West Division.

During its first year, it was called the Great Lakes Bowl.

Past CIFL Championships

Number of appearances

Box scores

Great Lakes Bowl I: Rochester Raiders vs. Port Huron Pirates

2007 CIFL Championship Game: Michigan Pirates vs. Rochester Raiders

2008 CIFL Championship Game: Saginaw Sting vs. Kalamazoo Xplosion

2009 CIFL Championship Game: Fort Wayne Freedom vs. Chicago Slaughter

2010 CIFL Championship Game: Cincinnati Commandos vs. Wisconsin Wolfpack

2011 CIFL Championship Game: Cincinnati Commandos vs. Marion Blue Racers

2012 CIFL Championship Game: Saginaw Sting vs. Dayton Silverbacks

2013 CIFL Championship Game: Erie Explosion vs. Saginaw Sting

2014 CIFL Championship Game: Erie Explosion at Marion Blue Racers

External links 
 Great Lakes Bowl I stats (2006)
 2007 Championship Game stats
 2008 Championship Game stats
 2009 Championship Game stats
 2010 Championship Game stats
 2012 Championship Game stats
 2013 Championship Game stats
 Championship Game all-time records
 Championship Game logos

Continental Indoor Football League
Indoor American football competitions